Nancy Thomson de Grummond (born 26 August 1940) is the M. Lynette Thompson Professor of Classics and Distinguished Research Professor at Florida State University. She specializes in Etruscan, Hellenistic and Roman archaeology. She serves as the director of archaeological excavations at Cetamura del Chianti in Tuscany, Italy. Her current research relates to Etruscan and Roman religion, myth and iconography.

Biography 
De Grummond earned a PhD in art history from the University of North Carolina at Chapel Hill in 1968. She has been a professor at Florida State University since 1968. She was a visiting professor at the University of North Carolina at Chapel Hill from 1989-1990, as well as the Parker Distinguished Visiting Lecturer at Brown University in 1991, and the Edgar Togo Salmon visiting professor at McMaster University in 2008.

Awards and honors 
De Grummond has been awarded numerous teaching awards at Florida State University including the Phi Beta Kappa Excellence in Teaching Award (2010). She is a foreign member of the Istituto Nazionale di Studi Etruschi ed Italici. She has held the AIA’s Joukowsky Lectureship, and was the Norton Lecturer in 2011/2012.

Selected publications
 1982 A Guide to Etruscan Mirrors
 1996 An Encyclopedia of the History of Classical Archaeology (editor) 2 v.
 2006 The Religion of the Etruscans (co-editor with Erika Simon)
 2007 Corpus Speculorum Etruscorum, Great Britain 3: Oxford (Corpus of Etruscan Mirrors), Rome
 2006 Etruscan Mythology, Sacred History and Legend
 2009 The Sanctuary of the Etruscan Artisans at Cetamura del Chianti: The Legacy of Alvaro Tracchi
 2016  "Thunder versus Lightning in Etruria," Etruscan Studies 19(2, 183-207.

External links
 Florida State University faculty page
 Cetamura del Chianti website
 Cetamura del Chianti Virtual Museum

References

Linguists of Etruscan
Living people
Florida State University faculty
21st-century American historians
American women historians
University of North Carolina alumni
21st-century American women writers
American women archaeologists
1940 births